Epicentr-Podolyany  is a Ukrainian professional men's volleyball team, based in Horodok (Khmelnytskyi Oblast), playing in Ukrainian Super League.

Achievements
 Vyshcha Liha
  (x1) 2020
 Druha Liha
  (x1) 2019

Season by season

Team roster
Team roster in season 2020-21

Starting lineup in season 2020-21

Technical staff

Squad changes 2020/2021

In 
 Denys Fomin from  Cambrai Volley
 Vladyslav Didenko from   Yugra-Samotlor Nizhnevartovsk
 Yurii Tomyn from  Barkom-Kazhany
 Daniil Anokhin from  Yurydychna Akademiya Kharkiv
 Vladyslav Pavlyuk from  Yurydychna Akademiya Kharkiv
 Marko Nikolić from  OK Niš

Out 
 Dmytro Kozlovskyi to  Lokomotyv Kharkiv

References

Ukrainian volleyball clubs
Sport in Khmelnytskyi Oblast